Líneik Anna Sævarsdóttir (born 3 November 1964) is an Icelandic politician who is a member of the Althing (Iceland's parliament) for the Northeast Constituency since 2013 and she has also served as the Deputy Chairman of the Constitutional and Supervisory Committee since 2017.

References

External links 
 Biography of Líneik Anna Sævarsdóttir on the parliament website (Icelandic)

Saevarsdottir, Lineik Anna
Saevarsdottir, Lineik Anna
Icelandic women in politics
Saevarsdottir, Lineik Anna
Members of the Althing
Progressive Party (Iceland) politicians
University of Iceland alumni
Politicians from Reykjavík
People from Reykjavík